The women's long jump event at the 2015 Asian Athletics Championships was held on June 3.

Results

References

Long
Long jump at the Asian Athletics Championships
2015 in women's athletics